Archaeoglobaceae are a family of the Archaeoglobales. All known genera within the Archaeoglobaceae are hyperthermophilic and can be found near undersea hydrothermal vents. Archaeoglobaceae are the only family in the order Archaeoglobales, which is the only order in the class Archaeoglobi.

Mode of metabolism 

While all genera within the Archaeoglobaceae are related to each other phylogenetically, the mode of metabolism used by each of these organisms is unique. Archaeoglobus are chemoorganotrophic sulfate-reducing archaea, the only known member of the Archaea that possesses this type of metabolism. Ferroglobus, in contrast, are chemolithotrophic organisms that couple the oxidation of ferrous iron to the reduction of nitrate. Geoglobus are iron reducing-archaea that use hydrogen gas or organic compounds as energy sources.

Phylogeny
The currently accepted taxonomy is based on the List of Prokaryotic names with Standing in Nomenclature (LPSN) and National Center for Biotechnology Information (NCBI).

See also
 List of Archaea genera

References

Further reading

Scientific books

Scientific databases

External links

Archaea taxonomic families
Thermophiles
Sulphophiles
Organisms living on hydrothermal vents
Euryarchaeota